was a Japanese architect and Head of the Japanese Ministry of Finance building section in the later Meiji period.

Credited with the design of many significant Meiji era structures in Japan, notably the Nihonbashi Bridge.

Early life and career
Together with Katayama Tokuma, Tatsuno Kingo, Sone Tatsuzō and Satachi Shichijiro, one of a group of renowned architectural students at the Imperial College of Engineering, Tokyo, and a protege of British architect Josiah Conder.

Tsumaki continued his studies in the United States where he graduated with a degree in Architecture from Cornell University in 1894. He then travelled to Berlin for further study in the same field, working at the same time in the architectural offices of Wilhelm Böckmann and Hermann Ende.

Buildings and Structures
 Sugamo Prison (1896)
 Yokohama Specie Bank, Yokohama Head Office (1904). Since 1968 the building has been used as the Kanagawa Prefectural Museum of Cultural History
 Yokohama Specie Bank Dalian Branch (1909).  Currently the Dalian branch of the Bank of China.
 Yokohama Red Brick Warehouse No. 2 Building (1911)
 Nihonbashi Bridge (1911)

References

External links
 

Japanese architects
1859 births
1916 deaths
Cornell University alumni